Abigail Lawson was an English stage actor of the seventeenth and early eighteenth century. She was a member of the United Company, making her first known appearance in The Marriage-Hater Matched by Thomas D'Urfey in 1692. From 1695 she was part of Thomas Betterton's breakaway company at the Lincoln's Inn Fields Theatre.

Selected roles
 Margery in The Marriage-Hater Matched by Thomas D'Urfey (1692)
 Mrs Dazie in The Canterbury Guests by Edward Ravenscroft (1694)
 Jenny in Love for Love by William Congreve (1695)
 Doll in She Ventures and He Wins by Ariadne (1695)
 Sprightly in The Lover's Luck by Thomas Dilke (1695)
 Nurse in The City Bride by Joseph Harris (1696)
 Beatrice in The Anatomist by Edward Ravenscroft (1696)
 Fidget in The City Lady by Thomas Dilke (1696)
 Euginia in The Innocent Mistress by Mary Pix (1697)
 Las Busque in The Intrigues at Versailles by Thomas D'Urfey (1697)
 Nibs in The Pretenders by Thomas Dilke (1698)
 Zelide in The False Friend by Mary Pix (1699)
 Lady Weepwell in The Ladies Visiting Day by William Burnaby (1701)
 Laura in Love Betrayed by William Burnaby (1703)
 Mrs Scribblescrabble in The Biter by Nicholas Rowe (1704)

References

Bibliography
 Bush-Bailey, Gilli. Treading the bawds: Actresses and playwrights on the Late Stuart stage. Manchester University Press, 2013.
 Highfill, Philip H, Burnim, Kalman A. & Langhans, Edward A. A Biographical Dictionary of Actors, Actresses, Musicians, Dancers, Managers & Other Stage Personnel in London, 1660–1800:. SIU Press, 1984.
 Lanier, Henry Wysham. The First English Actresses: From the Initial Appearance of Women on the Stage in 1660 Till 1700. The Players, 1930.
 Van Lennep, W. The London Stage, 1660–1800: Volume One, 1660–1700. Southern Illinois University Press, 1960.

17th-century English people
18th-century English people
English stage actresses
17th-century English actresses
18th-century English actresses
Year of birth unknown
Year of death unknown